Ficus stuhlmannii is a tree in the family Moraceae. It is commonly known as the lowveld fig. These trees are distributed from KwaZulu-Natal in South Africa to east Africa.

References
 Pooley, E. (1993). The Complete Field Guide to Trees of Natal, Zululand and Transkei. .

External links
  Ficus stuhlmannii pictures and information

stuhlmannii